New Hampton is a city in, and the county seat of, Chickasaw County, Iowa, United States. The population was 3,494 at the time of the 2020 census.

History
New Hampton was founded circa 1855. It is named after New Hampton, New Hampshire, the native town of one of its founders.

Geography
New Hampton is located at  (43.059701, -92.314703).

Climate

Demographics

2010 census
As of the 2010 census, there were 3,571 people, 1,555 households, and 943 families living in the city. The racial makeup of the city was 96.0% White, 0.3% African American, 0.1% Native American, 0.5% Asian, 2.5% from other races, and 0.4% from two or more races. Hispanic or Latino of any race were 3.9% of the population.

The median age in the city was 44.8 years. 22.9% of residents were under the age of 18; 6.7% were between the ages of 18 and 24; 20.6% were from 25 to 44; 26.8% were from 45 to 64; and 23% were 65 years of age or older. The gender makeup of the city was 47.4% male and 52.6% female.

2000 census
As of the 2000 census, there were 3,692 people, 1,545 households, and 976 families living in the city. The racial makeup of the city was 98.62% White, 0.03% Native American, 0.46% Asian, 0.03% Pacific Islander, 0.08% from other races, and 0.79% from two or more races. Hispanic or Latino of any race were 0.35% of the population.

There were 1,545 households, out of which 29.3% had children under the age of 18 living with them, 53.9% were married couples living together, 7.4% had a female householder with no husband present, and 36.8% were non-families. 33.5% of all households were made up of individuals, and 18.4% had someone living alone who was 65 years of age or older. The average household size was 2.28 and the average family size was 2.93.

Age spread: 23.1% under the age of 18, 7.3% from 18 to 24, 25.2% from 25 to 44, 21.6% from 45 to 64, and 22.8% who were 65 years of age or older. The median age was 41 years. For every 100 females, there were 90.9 males. For every 100 females age 18 and over, there were 82.5 males.

The median income for a household in the city was $40,082, and the median income for a family was $50,360. Males had a median income of $33,125 versus $21,217 for females. The per capita income for the city was $20,255. About 3.9% of families and 6.1% of the population were below the poverty line, including 6.0% of those under age 18 and 6.1% of those age 65 or over.

Education 
New Hampton Community School District operates local public schools.

St. Joseph's Catholic School, of the Roman Catholic Archdiocese of Dubuque, is in New Hampton. On August 15, 1904 the school building and convent, which had a cost of $15,000, were dedicated. A fire destroyed the building in November 1921; the cause was never uncovered. Construction on a new school began in spring 1922, with the cornerstone laid on May 1. C. O. Emery Construction company made the $56,731.67 two-story brick structure, which included a multipurpose room that housed a stage, auditorium, and/or gymnasium.

Gallery

Notable people

 William Barloon - Imprisoned in Iraq during Saddam Hussein's regime
 Rich Christensen — creator and producer of Pinks! on the Speed Channel
 Greg Ganske — former U.S. Representative
 Mike Humpal - former NFL player for the Pittsburgh Steelers and former football player for the Iowa Hawkeyes
 Duane Josephson — Major League Baseball catcher
 Kim Olson, military officer and political candidate
Bertha M. Rice – Writer, clubwoman, conservationist based in California
 Coleen Rowley — United States attorney
 Sarah Utterback — actress
 Carleton H. Wright — admiral

References

External links

 
New Hampton Community School District
City-Data Comprehensive Statistical Data and more about New Hampton

Cities in Chickasaw County, Iowa
Cities in Iowa
County seats in Iowa